K. M. Koushik  (born 8 November 1906, date of death unknown) was an Indian politician and a Member of Parliament of India. Koushik was a member of the 4th Lok Sabha and represented the Chandrapur (formally known as Chanda till 5th Lok Sabha) constituency of Maharashtra. He was a member of the Swatantra Party during his term as M.P.

Early life and education
Koushik was born in Manchanhalli which then was a part of Mysore State. Koushik attended Central College of Bangalore and College of Science and Law College in Nagpur and worked as an advocate before joining politics. Koushik was also a Public prosecutor and Government Pleader in the former State of M. P. (present state of Maharashtra) from 1950 to 1962.

Political career
Koushik contested the 1967 general elections as a member of Swatantra Party. He was a Member of Parliament for only one term.

Posts Held

See also

4th Lok Sabha
Lok Sabha
Politics of India
Parliament of India
Government of India
Swatantra Party
Indian National Congress
Chandrapur

References 

1906 births
Year of death missing
India MPs 1967–1970
Indian National Congress politicians
Lok Sabha members from Maharashtra
People from Chandrapur
People from Chandrapur district
Swatantra Party politicians